DBE may refer to:

Science and technology 
 dBe, decibels electrical, a unit of measure which measures the ratio of gain or attenuation of an electrical circuit
 Double bond equivalent, a term used in chemistry
 DBE (drug), also known as estrobin, a synthetic estrogen
 Dibromoethane
 Dibasic ester, an organic chemical compound
 Double-balloon enteroscopy, an endoscopic technique for visualization of the small bowel
 Design-basis event, the event which a nuclear facility is built to withstand
 DBE, database engineer, a new title for a  Database administrator (DBA)
 .dbe, a file format extension used by the HP WindowsCE ActiveSync backup software
 Double Buffer Extension, an X Window System extension

Other uses 
 Dame Commander of the Most Excellent Order of the British Empire, a grade within the British order of chivalry
 D-Block Europe, a British hip-hop collective
 Department of Basic Education, in the South African Government
 Deutsche Biographische Enzyklopädie, a German encyclopedia
Disadvantaged business enterprise, a term used in the United States to describe companies that are so certified by state governments
 Dominet Bank Ekstraliga, a Polish basketball league
 Dragonball Evolution, a 2009 film loosely based on the Dragon Ball manga